Thera is a genus of moths of the family Geometridae erected by James Francis Stephens in 1831.

Selected species
 Thera britannica (Turner, 1925) – spruce carpet
 Thera cembrae (Kitt, 1912)
 Thera cembrae cembrae (Kitt, 1912)
 Thera cembrae mugo Burmann & Tarmann, 1983
 Thera cognata (Thunberg, 1792)
 Thera cognata cognata (Thunberg, 1792)
 Thera cognata geneata (Feisthamel, 1835)
 Thera contractata (Packard, 1873)
 Thera cupressata (Geyer, 1831)
 Thera firmata (Hübner, 1822)
 Thera firmata consobrinata Curtis, 1834
 Thera firmata firmata (Hübner, 1822)
 Thera firmata tavoilloti Mazel, 1998
 Thera juniperata (Linnaeus, 1758) – juniper carpet
 Thera latens Barnes & McDunnough, 1917
 Thera obeliscata (Hübner, 1787)
 Thera otisi (Dyar, 1904)
 Thera ulicata (Rambur, 1934)
 Thera variata (Denis & Schiffermüller, 1775)
 Thera variata balcanicola de Lattin, 1951
 Thera variata variata (Denis & Schiffermüller, 1775)
 Thera variolata (Staudinger, 1899)
 Thera vetustata (Denis & Schiffermüller, 1775)

External links
 Thera on Fauna Europaea

Cidariini